Silver Liner is the third studio album by English multi-instrumentalist and record producer Ethan Johns, released on November 27, 2015 on Johns' own label, Three Crows Records. Produced by drummer Jeremy Stacey, Johns was accompanied on the album by The Black Eyed Dogs; a backing band includeding Stacey, pedal steel guitarist B. J. Cole and bass guitarist Nick Pini.

The album feature contributions from the Eagles' Bernie Leadon and singer-songwriter Gillian Welch.

Track listing

Personnel

Ethan Johns & the Black Eyed Dogs
Ethan Johns - vocals, guitars
Jeremy Stacey - drums, backing vocals, arrangements (5)
B.J. Cole - pedal steel guitar
Nick Pini - bass

Additional musicians
Gillian Welch - vocals (1, 4)
Richard Causon - accordion (3)
Bernie Leadon - vocals (4)
Everton Nelson - violin (5)
Tom Pigott Smith - violin (5)
Oli Langford - viola (5)
Ian Burdge - cello - (5)

Recording personnel
Jeremy Stacey - producer, engineer, mixing

Artwork
Trevor Moss - cover art

References

2015 albums